Beazer Homes USA, Inc. is a home construction company based in Atlanta, Georgia. In 2016, the company was the 11th largest home builder in the United States based on the number of homes closed. The company operates in 13 states.

As of December 31, 2016, the company had 161 active communities.

History
Beazer Homes USA was established in 1985 when Beazer, a British home construction company led by Brian Beazer, acquired Cohn Communities, an Atlanta-based home construction company. In 1986, the company acquired Gifford-Hill, a construction materials company. In 1988, it acquired Koppers in a hostile takeover.

In 1991, the British parent company was acquired by Hanson. 

In 1994, the company became a public company via an initial public offering. 

In 1997, the company acquired the assets of Calton Homes of Florida for $16.7 million.

In 2002, the company acquired Crossman Communities for $489.7 million in cash and stock. 

In 2004, the company acquired and started development on 242 home sites on Polk County, Florida. 

In 2006, the company acquired 86 town home sites in Seminole County, Florida.

In 2018, Beazer Homes announced it has entered into an agreement to acquire Venture Homes, a leading private homebuilder in Atlanta, for approximately $65 million. The transaction also includes substantial construction work in process as well as 51 homes in       backlog.

Controversies

Predatory lending and violations in mortgage servicing business
In March 2007, the company received a grand jury subpoena from the U.S. Attorney's Office in the United States District Court for the Western District of North Carolina seeking documents related to its mortgage loan origination services. The investigation followed articles in The Charlotte Observer which noted that the company's aggressive sales tactics led to an unusually high foreclosure rate in its developments.

Alleged violations of securities laws
In July 2007, the company was investigated by the U.S. Securities and Exchange Commission after Chief Accounting Officer Michael T. Rand was fired for violating ethics policies by attempting to destroy documents related to the company's mortgage origination services.

In 2014, Rand was found guilty of conspiracy and obstruction of justice charges.

$50 million settlement
On July 1, 2009, the company reached a $50 million settlement with several government agencies and admitted to fraudulent mortgage practices including retaining mortgage points that should have been used to lower interest rates charged, misinforming buyers that they were receiving down payment help when instead the price of the home was increased, circumventing HUD watch list programs, and ignoring borrower incomes when originating loans.

Settlement of captive title insurance kickback allegations
On October 30, 2007, the company agreed to pay $261,000 as part of a $1.4 million settlement by 6 home construction companies to resolve allegations by the U.S. Department of Housing and Urban Development that title insurance companies paid kickbacks to the builders in exchange for referrals. The companies denied wrongdoing and said that they settled to avoid legal expenses.

References

External links
 

Companies listed on the New York Stock Exchange
Construction and civil engineering companies of the United States
Home builders
Companies based in Atlanta
1994 initial public offerings